Vistabella, also known as Vistabella de Huerva, is a municipality in the province of Zaragoza, Aragon. According to the 2010 census the municipality has a population of 50 inhabitants.

The town is named after the Huerva River.

Photogallery

See also 
 List of municipalities in Zaragoza

References

External links

Guía de Vistabella

Municipalities in the Province of Zaragoza